Jean Calvé (born 30 April 1984) is a French former professional footballer who played as a right-back.

Career
Calvé was born in Cormeilles-en-Parisis, Val-d'Oise.

Sheffield United
Following his various loan spells in France, Calvé arrived at Bramall Lane on trial in July 2010.  Having played one pre-season game, then Blades boss Kevin Blackwell opted not to sign him.  However, following Blackwell's departure a few weeks later, incoming boss Gary Speed quickly revived the move and Calvé signed a one-year loan deal with the Yorkshire club and suggested a desire to remain with Sheffield United following the completion of his loan spell.

Calvé scored his first ever career goal in his début game for the Blades against Preston North End at the end of August, smashing a 35-yard shot into the top corner.  Despite an impressive start to his Blades career Calvé failed to cement himself in the first team, making only eighteen appearances that season.  With the arrival of yet another new manager, Micky Adams, he was deemed surplus to requirements and was eventually released from his contract at the start of April 2011.

Caen
On 22 May 2012, Calvé joined Ligue 2 side Stade Malherbe Caen on a free transfer.

Honours
 Ligue 2 team of the season: 2012–13

References

External links
Sheffield United club profile

1984 births
Living people
People from Cormeilles-en-Parisis
Footballers from Val-d'Oise
Association football defenders
French footballers
Ligue 1 players
Ligue 2 players
English Football League players
Segunda División B players
Belgian Pro League players
FC Sochaux-Montbéliard players
Le Mans FC players
FC Lorient players
AS Nancy Lorraine players
Grenoble Foot 38 players
Sheffield United F.C. players
Stade Malherbe Caen players
Amiens SC players
Oud-Heverlee Leuven players
CD El Ejido players
French expatriate footballers
French expatriate sportspeople in England
Expatriate footballers in England
French expatriate sportspeople in Belgium
Expatriate footballers in Belgium
French expatriate sportspeople in Spain
Expatriate footballers in Spain